The Bosphorus Rally (also called Istanbul Rally, Fiat Rally, Rally of Turkey and Günaydin Rally) is a rally event, held near İstanbul, Turkey. It is one of the first international rally events in Turkey. The first Bosphorus Rally was held in 1972. The rally was regular part of the European Rally Championship since its first incarnation and was also included in the Intercontinental Rally Challenge calendar.

The Bosphorus Rally was also called Rally of Turkey for a while. However, the Rally of Turkey which became a round from the World Rally Championship has HQ in Antalya and thus it's completely different from the Bosphorus Rally.

The Rally is not to be confused with the Boğaziçi Rallisi, held since 1975, also called Bosphorus Rally in some editions.

Winners 
Sources:

Notes:
 - The rally had various name incarnations during the years.
 - Yağiz Avci set the overall fastest time, but he wasn't registered for the European Rally Championship and therefore he isn't recognized as the winner by the FIA. In ERC FIA recognized the second fastest overall Luca Betti as winner.

References

External links
 The official website for the rally

Rally competitions in Turkey
European Rally Championship rallies
Intercontinental Rally Challenge rallies